Provanna goniata is a species of deep-sea sea snail, a marine gastropod mollusk in the family Provannidae.

Description

Distribution
This marine species occurs in East Pacific hydrothermal vents in the Guyamas Transform Ridge

References

External links
 Warén A. & Bouchet P. (2001). Gastropoda and Monoplacophora from hydrothermal vents and seeps new taxa and records. The Veliger 44(2): 116–231

goniata
Gastropods described in 1986